Mark Lasky (1954 – July 31, 1983 in New York City) was an American cartoonist known for having succeeded Ernie Bushmiller on Nancy.

Lasky first worked on Nancy as Bushmiller's editor, and was named the strip's new writer and artist after Bushmiller's death in 1982. He had previously worked on other comic strips, including Mell Lazarus's Miss Peach and Momma. After less than a year, however, Lasky died of cancer; there was no gap in Nancy publication, as Lasky had prepared enough strips to run for two more months, during which publishers were able to arrange for Jerry Scott to succeed Lasky.

In his honor, United Media and Parsons The New School for Design launched the Mark Lasky Memorial Internship in 1984.

References

American cartoonists
Art Students League of New York alumni
University of Bridgeport alumni
1954 births
1983 deaths
Deaths from cancer in New York (state)